Marco Fortes (born 26 September 1982) is a male shot putter from Portugal. His personal best throw is 21.02 meters – Portuguese record – was achieved at the 2012 European Cup Winter Throwing in Bar, Montenegro, where he won the gold medal.

Career
Fortes was born in Portugal to Mozambican immigrants. At the age of 25, he was the first Portuguese shot putter to participate in the Olympics. In Beijing 2008, after beating his personal (and national) record (18.05) he jokingly stated "I seem to perform better in the afternoon. Apparently I would do better to remain in bed on mornings." In response, he was expelled from the Olympic committee. This spawned controversy, especially when Nelson Évora, who was the only Portuguese athlete to earn olympic gold that year, protested against his expulsion upon his victory speech on national TV.

Marco Fortes carried on beating his personal (and national) records, arriving at 20.52 in 2009, 20.89 in 2011, and 21,02 in 2012. 
In his second participation in the Olympics, in London 2012, he rose from his 2008 classification of 38th place to 15th place.

Achievements

References

External links
 
 
 

1982 births
Living people
Athletes from Lisbon
Portuguese male shot putters
Athletes (track and field) at the 2008 Summer Olympics
Athletes (track and field) at the 2012 Summer Olympics
Olympic athletes of Portugal
S.L. Benfica athletes
Portuguese people of Mozambican descent
Black Portuguese sportspeople